ZFC — Zermelo–Fraenkel set theory — is one of the foundations of modern mathematics.

ZFC may also refer to:
 Zeyashwemye F.C., an association football club from Myanmar
 ZFC Meuselwitz, a football club in Germany
 Zico Football Center, a sports complex in Brazil
 Zambia Forestry College
 Nikon Z fc, a digital camera model